The 65th District of the Iowa House of Representatives in the state of Iowa.

Current elected officials
Liz Bennett is the representative currently representing the district.

Past representatives
The district has previously been represented by:
 Samuel F. Anania, 1971–1973
 Philip B. Hill, 1973–1975
 Julia Gentleman, 1975–1979
 Lawrence Pope, 1979–1983
 Charles N. Poncy, 1983–1993
 Mark A. Haverland, 1993–1995
 Jeff Lamberti, 1995–1999
 Carmine Boal, 1999–2003
 Wayne Ford, 2003–2011
 Ruth Ann Gaines, 2011–2013
 Tyler Olson, 2013–2015
 Liz Bennett, 2015–present

References

065